Wilton (formerly Wilton Junction) is a city in Cedar and Muscatine counties in the U.S. state of Iowa. The population was 2,924 at the time of the 2020 census. The Muscatine County portion of Wilton is part of the Muscatine Micropolitan Statistical Area.

History 
The first settler to build a home in the area that was to be known as Wilton in the new state of Iowa (1846) was Mr. Christian Marolf who came in July 1849, and erected of a small log house opposite the German Lutheran church. When he built his home Mr. Marolf could only see one the home of Mr. Stearns just west of town on the south side of the Moscow road.  Mr. Marolf was soon followed by Mr. Ben Maurer in 1850 whose land now comprises North Wilton and Peter Marolf in 1851, which is now known as Marolf's addition. North Wilton is at present (1947) not within the corporate limits of Wilton.  The city was once home to the Wilton German English College from 1894 to 1905.  The campus of the college was later turned into City Park, and some of the college's buildings remain to this day.

Geography 
Wilton is at  (41.589350, -91.017487).

The city sits at an elevation of 679 feet.

Demographics

2010 census
As of the census of 2010, there were 2,802 people, 1,155 households, and 767 families residing in the city. The racial makeup of the city was 97.5% White, 0.3% African American, 0.1% Asian, 0.9% from other races, and 1.2% from two or more races. Hispanic or Latino of any race were 2.6% of the population.

There were 1,155 households, of which 34.2% had children under the age of 18 living with them, 50.5% were married couples living together, 10.3% had a female householder with no husband present, 5.6% had a male householder with no wife present, and 33.6% were non-families. 28.1% of all households were made up of individuals, and 10.7% had someone living alone who was 65 years of age or older. The average household size was 2.43 and the average family size was 2.97.

The median age in the city was 37.7 years. 26.2% of residents were under the age of 18; 8.1% were between the ages of 18 and 24; 25.5% were from 25 to 44; 27.4% were from 45 to 64; and 13% were 65 years of age or older. The gender makeup of the city was 49.7% male and 50.3% female.

2000 census
As of the census of 2000, there were 2,842 people, 1,105 households, and 784 families residing in the city. The racial makeup of the city was 97.74% White, 0.21% African American, 0.21% Native American, 0.46% Asian, 0.60% from other races, and 0.78% from two or more races. Hispanic or Latino of any race were 2.01% of the population.

There were 1,105 households, out of which 36.1% had children under the age of 18 living with them, 58.2% were married couples living together, 8.3% had a female householder with no husband present, and 29.0% were non-families. 25.3% of all households were made up of individuals, and 8.7% had someone living alone who was 65 years of age or older. The average household size was 2.54 and the average family size was 3.05.

In the city, the population was spread out, with 27.7% under the age of 18, 8.5% from 18 to 24, 30.5% from 25 to 44, 20.0% from 45 to 64, and 13.2% who were 65 years of age or older. The median age was 35 years. For every 100 females, there were 93.8 males. For every 100 females age 18 and over, there were 93.7 males.

The median income for a household in the city was $44,278, and the median income for a family was $49,615. Males had a median income of $37,146 versus $23,350 for females. The per capita income for the city was $18,445. About 5.5% of families and 6.5% of the population were below the poverty line, including 9.2% of those under age 18 and 3.8% of those age 65 or over.

Arts and culture 

Witon has a library/community center building in the northeast section of the city, near the high school that provides numerous resources to residents.

Historic sites include the Wilton Candy Kitchen, which is the oldest ice cream parlor in the world, and the former Chicago, Rock Island, and Pacific Railroad depot built in 1898.  Both are in the downtown area and on the National Register of Historic Places.

Parks and recreation 
Wilton has four parks.  The City Park (known by residents as the Blue Park) in the heart of the town has an indoor swimming pool as well as a playground, shelter house, and baseball field.  Westview Park is on the west side of town and has tennis courts, playground equipment, a walking path, and a ball field.  Elder Park is in the downtown area and has a small picnic area.  Cherrydale Park on the southside contains three baseball fields and a playground.

Religion
Wilton is home to many churches, including St. Mary's Catholic Church, Presbyterian Church, Grace United Church of Christ, Heartland Fellowship Church, United Methodist Church, and the Zion Lutheran Church.

Education 
Public schools
The Wilton Community School District, home to the Wilton Beavers, and is part of the River Valley Conference, serves Wilton, Moscow, and the surrounding rural areas.  The school district includes an elementary school and a junior/senior high school. Which is now a connecting part of the new elemantry the school has a student-teacher ratio of 12:1

Media 
Wilton-Durant Advocate News is a weekly newspaper in the area.  Daily newspapers such as The Muscatine Journal and Quad-City Times are available.

Wilton Jr./Sr. High School has a student-run school news website called This Just In, which is maintained during the school year by journalism students. The class also produces a student newspaper called "The Beaver Tale" which is printed monthly during the school year in the Advocate News.

Infrastructure

Transportation 
Wilton is three miles (5 km) south of Interstate 80, at the junction of County Highway F58 and Iowa Highway 38, within driving distance of Muscatine, the Quad Cities, Iowa City, and Cedar Rapids. The Iowa Interstate Railroad passes through the city and provides service to local industries.  The Quad City International Airport is 30 miles east of Wilton providing non-stop flights to destinations throughout the country. Wilton sits along the historic transcontinental U.S. Route 6, though this section was transferred to IA927 and later to county F58.

Utilities 
Electricity is provided by Wilton Municipal Light and Power Company and water by the city water department, which operates its own water treatment plant.  The city has a 500,000 gallon water tower on the west side of town near the industrial park, and another 300,000-gallon tower in the center of the city.

Healthcare 
Trinity Medical Center in Muscatine has a "physicians' clinic" located in Wilton. The closest hospitals are located in Muscatine (Trinity-Muscatine), the Quad Cities (Genesis West, Genesis East, Trinity-Bettendorf), and Iowa City (University of Iowa Hospitals and Clinics, Mercy Hospital, and the Veteran's Hospital).

Police Department and Fire Department
The city is served by the Wilton Police Department and Wilton Fire Department.

Notable people 

 Eddy Chandler, actor was born and raised in Wilton.
 Charles H. Gabriel, hymnwriter was born and raised in Wilton.
 Wally Hilgenberg; played in NFL for the Detroit Lions and Super Bowls with Minnesota Vikings and was raised partly in Wilton.
 S. J. Mathes, printer and newspaperman

See also

References

External links 

 Portal website to Wilton City of Wilton, Chamber of Commerce, Community events and development
 IaGenWeb Wilton History 1854–1947
 City Data Comprehensive Statistical Data and more about Wilton, Iowa

 

 
Cities in Cedar County, Iowa
Cities in Muscatine County, Iowa
Cities in Iowa
Muscatine, Iowa micropolitan area
1855 establishments in Iowa
Populated places established in 1855